Joshua Fry Bell (November 26, 1811 – August 17, 1870) was a Kentucky slave owner and political figure.

Bell was born in Danville, Kentucky, where he attended public schools and then Centre College, where he graduated in 1828. He next studied law in Lexington, Kentucky, and travelled around Europe for several years before returning home and being  admitted to the bar.

Bell owned four slaves as of the 1850 census, and 14 as of the 1860 census.

Bell was elected as a Whig to the 29th Congress in November 1844. He did not seek reelection and served a single term in the House, March 4, 1845 – March 4, 1847. He was the Kentucky Secretary of State in 1849, and was sent by Kentucky as a commissioner to the Peace Conference held in Washington, D.C. in February 1861, in an unsuccessful last-ditch effort to stave off what became the American Civil War.

Bell served in the Kentucky House of Representatives from 1862 to 1867. Union Democrats attempted to nominate him for Governor of Kentucky in 1863, but he declined the nomination.

Joshua Fry Bell died in 1870 in Danville at the age of 58 and was interred at Bellevue Cemetery. Bell County, Kentucky is named in his honor.

References

1811 births
1870 deaths
Politicians from Danville, Kentucky
American people of Scotch-Irish descent
Burials in Bellevue Cemetery (Danville, Kentucky)
Whig Party members of the United States House of Representatives from Kentucky
Secretaries of State of Kentucky
Members of the Kentucky House of Representatives
Kentucky lawyers
Centre College alumni
19th-century American lawyers